Nie Er, formerly romanized as Nieh Erh, is a 1959 biopic of the Chinese musician Nie Er, a Communist Party member who drowned in Japan during his flight to Russia away from Nationalist oppression. The story centers on his composition of "The March of the Volunteers", the theme song to the 1935 drama Children of Troubled Times which was later adopted as the national anthem of the People's Republic of China. The movie was released to coincide with the 10th anniversary of the PRC's founding.

See also
 List of Chinese movies of the 1950s
 The National Anthem, the 1999 film retelling the same story from Tian Han's point of view

References

1959 films
Chinese drama films